Pavel Alyaksandravich Rybak (born 11 September 1983) is a Belarusian professional footballer.

Honours
Shakhtyor Soligorsk
Belarusian Cup winner: 2018–19

BATE Borisov
Belarusian Cup winner: 2020–21

External links

1983 births
Living people
Belarusian footballers
Association football defenders
FC Torpedo Minsk players
FC SKVICH Minsk players
FC Lida players
FC Smorgon players
FC Gomel players
FC Minsk players
FC Neman Grodno players
FC Shakhtyor Soligorsk players
FC Isloch Minsk Raion players
FC BATE Borisov players